Stanisław Szostecki (15 January 1968 – 3 November 2021) was a Polish wrestler. He competed in the men's freestyle 48 kg at the 1992 Summer Olympics.

References

External links
 

1968 births
2021 deaths
Polish male sport wrestlers
Olympic wrestlers of Poland
Wrestlers at the 1992 Summer Olympics
People from Rzeszów County
Sportspeople from Podkarpackie Voivodeship